Wola Okrzejska  is a village in the administrative district of Gmina Krzywda, within Łuków County, Lublin Voivodeship, in eastern Poland.

The village has a population of 980.

Henryk Sienkiewicz Museum
The Museum of Henryk Sienkiewicz is located in Wola Okrzejska at 21-480 Okrzeja; Phone: 025 755 9000; Tel. / fax: 025 797 6000.

Notable residents
Henryk Sienkiewicz (1846–1916), a Polish journalist and Nobel Prize-winning novelist, was born there.
Lewis Bernstein Namier (1888–1960), an English historian, was born there as well.

References

Villages in Łuków County